Generate may refer to:
 Creation (disambiguation)

Science and math:
 Generate and test (trial and error)
 Generating function, in math and physics
 Generating primes
 Generating set
 Generating trigonometric tables

Other:
 Generated collection, in music theory
 Generate LA-NY, digital entertainment studio
 "Generate", a song by Collective Soul
 "Generate", a song by Eric Prydz

See also
 Generation (disambiguation)
 Generator (disambiguation)
 Generative (disambiguation)
 Gene (disambiguation)